was a stable of sumo wrestlers, part of the Tokitsukaze ichimon or group of stables. It was set up in November 1970 by former yokozuna Kashiwado, who branched off from the Isenoumi stable. Upon his death in December 1996 the stable passed to his protégé, former sekiwake Tagaryū. For many years it had just two wrestlers, one of them Tagaryū's son Ryūsei, making it the smallest active stable. It was decided at a Japan Sumo Association board meeting on July 21, 2021 that it would close immediately with all its personnel transferring to Isenoumi stable.

Ring name conventions
Many wrestlers at this stable have taken ring names or shikona that include the character 竜 (read: ryū), meaning dragon, in deference to their coach and the stable's owner, the former Tagaryū.

Owners
1996–2021: 8th Kagamiyama Shōji (riji, former sekiwake Tagaryū)
1970-1996: 7th Kagamiyama Tsuyoshi (Kashiwado, the 47th yokozuna)

Coach
Katsunoura Toshirō (iin, former maegashira Kirinishiki)

Notable former members
Kirinishiki (former maegashira)
Konuma (former maegashira)
Zaōnishiki (former maegashira)

Location and access
Tokyo, Katsushika Ward, Shin-Koiwa 3-28-21
15 minute walk from Shin-Koiwa Station on Sōbu Line

See also
List of sumo stables
Glossary of sumo terms

References

External links
Japan Sumo Association profile
Twitter Page (in Japanese)

Defunct sumo stables